Steven Craig Waterbury (April 6, 1952 – May 19, 2017) was a Major League Baseball pitcher. He batted and threw right-handed.

He was signed by the Cardinals as an amateur free agent in 1971.

Waterbury died May 19, 2017.

References

External links

1952 births
2017 deaths
Baseball players from Illinois
St. Louis Cardinals players
St. Petersburg Cardinals players
Oklahoma City 89ers players
Arkansas Travelers players
Tulsa Oilers (baseball) players
Cedar Rapids Cardinals players
Modesto Reds players
People from Carbondale, Illinois